WWHN is a radio station licensed in Joliet, Illinois serving the Chicago metropolitan area with an urban adult contemporary format. It operates on AM frequency 1510 kHz and is under ownership of Hawkins Broadcasting Company. Because it shares the same frequency as "clear channel" station WLAC in Nashville, Tennessee, WWHN operates during daytime hours only.

The station is simulcast on 88.9 WWHN-FM, licensed to Irondale, Illinois, and serving Chicago's Far Southeast Side and parts of Northwest Indiana.

History

WJRC
The station first began broadcasting on April 10, 1964 as WJRC. Its call sign stood for "Joliet Radio Corporation", the station's owner at the time. The station ran 500 watts, during daytime hours only.

WJRC aired an easy listening format in the early 1970s. Later in the decade and into the 1980s, the station aired a full service format, programming a variety of music along with news and talk programming. William G. Barr hosted a twice-weekly radio program on WJRC from November 11, 1986 until his death in February 1987.

WWHN
The station's callsign was changed to WWHN on September 14, 1987. The station briefly aired an all-news format, before adopting an oldies format with the slogan "Remember When". In 1989, WWHN was purchased by Hawkins Broadcasting Corporation for $250,000.

In 1990, the station's power was increased to 1,000 watts. In 1991, the station's format was changed from urban oldies to black gospel. In 1992, the station was simulcast on 102.3 WTAS in Crete, Illinois, as well as 105.5 KWHN-FM and 1580 KLVU in Haynesville, Louisiana.

Repeater

References

External links

 
 

WHN
Urban adult contemporary radio stations in the United States
Radio stations established in 1964
1964 establishments in Illinois
WHN